Dammeron Valley is a census-designated place in central Washington County, Utah, United States. The population was 803 at the 2010 census. Although Dammeron Valley is unincorporated, it has its own ZIP code of 84783.

Demographics
As of the census of 2010, there were 803 people living in the CDP. There were 317 housing units. The racial makeup of the town was 98.6% White, 0.5% American Indian and Alaska Native, 0.7% Asian, 0.2% Native Hawaiian and Other Pacific Islander, 0.4% from some other race, and 1.5% from two or more races. Hispanic or Latino of any race were 1.5% of the population.

See also

 List of census-designated places in Utah

References

External links

 Dammeron Valley Landowners Association website

Census-designated places in Washington County, Utah
Census-designated places in Utah